KRHP-LD, virtual and UHF digital channel 14, was a low-power NRB-affiliated television station licensed to The Dalles, Oregon, United States. The station was owned by Robert H. Pettitt.

Pettitt surrendered the license for KRHP-LD to the Federal Communications Commission (FCC) on December 17, 2021, who canceled it the same day.

Subchannels
The station's digital signal was multiplexed:

References

RHP-LD
The Dalles, Oregon
Television channels and stations established in 1995
1995 establishments in Oregon
Low-power television stations in the United States
Defunct television stations in the United States
Television channels and stations disestablished in 2021
2021 disestablishments in Oregon